The North Side is a neighborhood in northern section of the New York State city of Binghamton. It is a mixed-use urban neighborhood with commercial and industrial businesses many times occupying sections of residential blocks.

The North Side can be defined as encompassing the area north of the Norfolk Southern tracks and Downtown Binghamton, east of the Chenango River and the First Ward, west of the East Side of Binghamton and a small portion of the town of Dickinson and south of the village of Port Dickinson of the town of Dickinson along Bromley Avenue.

The area's "main drag" is Chenango Street. It forms the neighborhood's "spine," running on a north-south axis, starting at the Broome County Courthouse in downtown and continuing north into the neighboring communities. The neighborhood is also served by the partially limited-access Brandywine Highway which carries (NY-7).

Demographics
As of the 2010 census, the North Side of Binghamton had a population of 1,969. 62.7% were White(Non-Hispanic), 18.7% African-American, 3.4% Asian and 9.6% Hispanic. The 2005-2009 American Community Survey estimates that 40.1% of the North Side was below the poverty level, including 48.8% of children younger than 18.

Neighborhoods in Binghamton, New York
Poverty in the United States